In Greek mythology, Taenarus (Ancient Greek: Ταίναρος) was the eponym of Cape Taenarum, Mount Taenarum and the city Taenarus at Peloponnese. In different accounts, he is given as:

Taenarus, son of Zeus and brother of Calabrus and Geraestus. The three brothers were said to have sailed to Peloponnese and to have seized a portion of land there, where Taenarus founded a sanctuary of Poseidon known as "Taenarum".
Taenarus, son of Poseidon.
Taenarus, son of Elatus, himself son of Icarius, and Erymede, daughter of Damasiclus; was said to have had the city, the mountain, and the harbor named after him. Stephanus (who writes of him as a son rather than a grandson of Icarius) considers him to be a figure distinct from Taenarus, son of Zeus.

Taenaran gateway: Taenarus, at the tip of the middle peninsula at the south of Peloponnese, was a conventional entrance to the underworld.

Notes

References 

 Publius Ovidius Naso, Metamorphoses translated by Brookes More (1859-1942). Boston, Cornhill Publishing Co. 1922. Online version at the Perseus Digital Library.
 Publius Ovidius Naso, Metamorphoses. Hugo Magnus. Gotha (Germany). Friedr. Andr. Perthes. 1892. Latin text available at the Perseus Digital Library.
 Stephanus of Byzantium, Stephani Byzantii Ethnicorum quae supersunt, edited by August Meineike (1790-1870), published 1849. A few entries from this important ancient handbook of place names have been translated by Brady Kiesling. Online version at the Topos Text Project.

Children of Zeus
Children of Poseidon
Demigods in classical mythology
Laconian characters in Greek mythology